Taba is a village on the northwest coast of Guadalcanal, Solomon Islands. It lies on Coughlin Bay.

References

Populated places in Guadalcanal Province